Krutets is a rural locality (a village) in Azletskoye Rural Settlement, Kharovsky District, Vologda Oblast, Russia. The population was 14 as of 2002.

Geography 
Krutets is located 70 km northwest of Kharovsk (the district's administrative centre) by road. Dor is the nearest rural locality.

References 

Rural localities in Kharovsky District